The 1867 East Suffolk by-election was held on 20 February 1867 after the resignation of the Conservative MP Sir Edward Kerrison.  It was retained by the Conservative candidate Frederick Snowdon Corrance.

References

1867 in England
1867 elections in the United Kingdom
East